Zali Log is a village in the Municipality of Železniki in the Upper Carniola region of Slovenia.

Name
Zali Log was attested in historical sources as Stubem in 1485–1490, Stuben in 1500, and Salemlogu in 1500. The name is derived from *Zъ̀lъjь lǫ̂gъ in the sense of 'bad (marshy) meadow' (cf. Hudi Log for a toponym with a similar semantic motivation).

Churches

The parish church is dedicated to the Assumption of Mary. It is an originally Gothic church, redesigned in the Baroque style in the 1740s. It contains a ceiling fresco by Janez Gosar and an altar painting by Janez Wolf. A second church stands on Suša Hill east of the settlement. It is dedicated to Our Lady of Loreto and was built from 1875 to 1876 where a wayside shrine formerly stood. It was built in the Renaissance Revival style and was designed by Franc Faleschini.

Gallery

References

External links

Zali Log at Geopedia
Zali Log web site

Populated places in the Municipality of Železniki